Marajá do Sena is a municipality in the state of Maranhão in the Northeast region of Brazil. The municipality is considered to be the poorest in Maranhão.

See also
List of municipalities in Maranhão

References

Municipalities in Maranhão